Cyanopepla pretiosa is a moth of the subfamily Arctiinae. It was described by Hermann Burmeister in 1880. It is found in Argentina and Colombia.

References

Cyanopepla
Moths described in 1880